Kaveh Kali (also Romanized as Kāveh Kālī; also known as Kokālī) is a village in Koregah-e Gharbi Rural District, in the Central District of Khorramabad County, Lorestan Province, Iran. At the 2006 census, its population was 197, in 33 families.

References 

Towns and villages in Khorramabad County